Hevelius is a low-rimmed lunar impact crater that lies at the western edge of the Oceanus Procellarum, named after the astronomer Johannes Hevelius. The smaller but prominent crater Cavalerius is joined to the northern rim by low ridges. Due south of Hevelius is the crater Lohrmann and the dark-hued Grimaldi.

Only a low, eroded rim of Hevelius rises above the surface. The western wall is overlain by several small impacts. The flat floor of the crater has been flooded by lava, and is now cross-crossed by a system of small clefts named the Rimae Hevelius. There is a low, one-km-high central peak offset to the northwest of the midpoint. The northeastern part of the interior is more irregular and contains a straight ridge running toward the southeast. Along the northwest floor, near the inner wall, is a small crater.

This feature is sometimes referred to as Hevel, the astronomer's name in German (Hevelius is a Latinized form).

Satellite craters

By convention these features are identified on lunar maps by placing the letter on the side of the crater midpoint that is closest to Hevelius.

References

 
 
 
 
 
 
 
 
 
 
 
 

Impact craters on the Moon